Kowalewo-Skorupki  is a village in the administrative district of Gmina Gozdowo, within Sierpc County, Masovian Voivodeship, in east-central Poland.

Kowalewo-Skorupki - a village in Poland located in Mazowieckie, Sierpc in the county, the municipality Gozdowo. Kowalewo-Skorupki was in the past, part of the local gentry called Kowalewo. In the thirteenth century, there were already settlements called Kowalewo (the establishment of the parish in Gozdowo in 1305). The name Skorupki showing for the first time in 1404, from the daughter of Nicholas Diwkę the Skorupki. The name of the village until the sixteenth century was written differently, Kowalewo alias Skorupki, or Skorupki Kowalewo.

Near the village there was a settlement Kowalewo-Sule having been listed at the end of the eighteenth century (lying between Kovalev and Białutami Podbornym). Initially it was a village belonging to one branch of the Kowalewo family. A list of Tax from 1531 mentions two heirs, Paweł and Andrzej Jana Mścicha. They belonged to the family coat of arms Junosza Kowalewskich. Inventory tax in 1578 shows the breakdown of the village into three parts. In the second half of the seventeenth century, mainly Kowalewscy lived here, with six nobility. In 1734 the divisions of the Kowalewo area were: Kowalewscy, Łukoscy, Umińscy, Kuskowscy, Rycharski and Czachorowski. According to the census of the landowners of the late eighteenth century inherited here: Czarnomski, Koskowscy, Kowalewscy, Roman, Rycharscy, Umieński. So, it was a village divided between a number of nobles. Some belonged to the poor gentry, and others to a richer small farm. In 1827 the Skorupki was recorded 8 houses 59 residents. During the January Uprising gentry was the basic strength of the insurgent troops.

The Skorupki in 1883 counted 8 houses and 80 residents. The whole village had 338 acres of land including 302 acres of land of the manor. This small village parochial become an important educational center in the area. Since 1890 there has been a parish school here. They then created a folk school. At the same time the construction of a brick elementary school took place (before World War I). It was one of the first brick school in the district. It was one of the rebel schools during the events of the years 1905-1907, apparently burning portraits of the Tsar. In 1921, this town had 9 houses and 91 residents, belonged to the municipality of Białyszewo. There are two historic buildings: the wooden house number 8 from the mid-nineteenth century, the property of J. Kowalewski, and the wooden house from the mid-nineteenth century, J. Kowalewski property.
In the years 1975-1998 the town administratively belonged to the province of Plock.

The village has a population of 70.

References

Kowalewo-Skorupki